Griswoldville is an unincorporated community in Jones County, in the U.S. state of Georgia. Griswoldville is located about ten miles east of Macon.

History
A post office called Griswoldville was established in 1849, and remained in operation until 1928. Variant names are "Griswold" and "Griswoldsville".

The community was founded as an industrial site/company town by, and named for, Samuel Griswold, proprietor of a local cotton mill.  In addition to his three-story, 24-room mansion, Griswold built a church, slave and workers quarters, expanded his cotton gin factory (which later produced firearms), a saw mill, a grist mill, brickworks, and factories that made furniture, candles, soap, and other products.

The town was largely destroyed at the Battle of Griswoldville in 1864 during the American Civil War.

References

Unincorporated communities in Georgia (U.S. state)
Unincorporated communities in Jones County, Georgia